Ogbu is a given name and family name, with origins in Igbo language and commonly found in Nigeria.

People with the given name Ogbu 
 Ogbu Kalu (1942 – 2009), Nigerian theologian

People with the surname Ogbu 
 Chigozie Ogbu, Nigerian academician
 Derick Ogbu (born 1990), Nigerian professional footballer
 Igoh Ogbu (born 2000), Nigerian professional footballer
 John Ogbu (1939–2003), Nigerian-American anthropologist and professor 
 Liz Ogbu, American architect, designer and urbanist
 Moses Ogbu (born 1991), Nigerian footballer
 Ollie Ogbu (born 1987), American Defensive Line coach for Wagner College  
 Osita Ogbu, Nigerian professor of economics at the University of Nigeria

Igbo names
Surnames of Nigerian origin